Syntripsa is a genus of freshwater crabs found in lakes on the Indonesian island of Sulawesi.

Species
There are two species in this genus:

 Syntripsa flavichela 
 Syntripsa matannensis

References

Further reading

Schubart, Christoph D., Tobias Santl, and Peter Koller. "Mitochondrial patterns of intra-and interspecific differentiation among endemic freshwater crabs of ancient lakes in Sulawesi." Contributions to Zoology 77.2 (2008): 83-90.
Schubart, Christoph D., and Peter KL Ng. "A new molluscivore crab from Lake Poso confirms multiple colonization of ancient lakes in Sulawesi by freshwater crabs (Decapoda: Brachyura)." Zoological Journal of the Linnean Society 154.2 (2008): 211-221.
Poettinger, Theodor, and Christoph D. Schubart. "Molecular diversity of freshwater crabs from Sulawesi and the sequential colonization of ancient lakes." Hydrobiologia 739.1 (2014): 73-84.

External links

WORMS

Decapod genera
Freshwater crustaceans of Asia
Crustaceans of Indonesia